Saint-Cassien may refer to the following places in France:

Saint-Cassien, Dordogne, a commune in the Dordogne department 
Saint-Cassien, Isère, a commune in the Isère department